The Ponta do Albernaz Lighthouse is a beacon/lighthouse located along the cliffs of Ponta do Albernaz in the northern parish of Ponta Delgada on the island of Flores, in the Archipelago of the Azores, Portugal.

History

It was erected in the northwest tip of the island, over a clifftop that allowed visibility to northern traffic around the island's waters.

Initially projected under the 1883 Plano Geral de Alumiamento e Balizagem (Illumination and Buoyage General Plan) for the settlement of Ponta Delgada, its construction was pre-empted by the 1902 commission, which intended to develop a new lighthouse based on modern technologies at the time.

This was a polemic decision, as indicated from the commission's minutes, wherein the body decided firmly:
"It was of great importance to the Commission that the illumination of that group (the islands of Flores and Corvo) that a study was made, with the most blatant attention and debated, the group of advantages that could accrue to navigation, by installing on the same Ponta do Albernaz a hyper-radiant appliance."

The 1902 commission in charge of adapting the general plan to the new realities, proposed the installation of a first-order light, with an equidistant beacon providing rotation at 5 second intervals.

A friendly contract was signed with property-owner João Lourenço in 1922, and the  pastureland was expropriated (at the cost of $3.500 reis), for the construction of the lighthouse. It was a real feat of construction, since there was no access by road to the parish of Ponta Delgada, and much less to the tip of Albernaz.

The lighthouse was equipped with a third-order dioptoric beacon with a  focal length, moved by clockwork turntable, serving a  range.
 
In 1938, a plane crashed in the vicinity of the lighthouse.

The site was electrified in 1956, using generating cells, and a new 3000 Watt/110 Volt lamp was installed. But, it was only in another four years before the site became linked to the telephone network. In the following decades new improvements were installed at the site, including the expansion of the lighthouse and in the upgrade of the beacon with a  1000 W, 120 Volt lamp (in 1983). In 1968, the parish priest (João de Jesus Lourenço) acquired  for 1000$00 escudos, with the intent of expanding the number of lighthouse-keepers. in the 1980s, the lamp was replaced with metallic 1000 Watt/120 Volt halogen lamp.

Yet, by 2005, it was the unique lighthouse in the country not linked to the national electrical network.

References

Notes

Sources
 
 
 
 

Lighthouses completed in 1925
Ponta Albernaz
Buildings and structures in Santa Cruz das Flores